Johnny on the Spot is a 1954 British crime drama film directed by Maclean Rogers and starring Hugh McDermott, Elspet Gray and Paul Carpenter. It was shot at Bushey Studios and on location in London. It was produced as a second feature.

Cast 
 Hugh McDermott as Johnny Breakes
 Elspet Gray as Joan Ingram
 Paul Carpenter as Paul Carrington
 Jean Lodge as Sally Erskine
 Ronald Adam as Inspector Beveridge
 Valentine Dyall as Tyneley
 Graham Stark as Stevie
 Bruce Beeby as Hotel Garage Attendant (uncredited)
 Ronald Leigh-Hunt as Jeremy Oulton (uncredited)
 Conrad Phillips as Police Sergeant (uncredited)

References

Bibliography
 Chibnall, Steve & McFarlane, Brian. The British 'B' Film. Palgrave MacMillan, 2009.

External links
 

British crime drama films
1954 films
1954 crime drama films
Films directed by Maclean Rogers
British black-and-white films
Bushey Studios films
Films shot in London
1950s English-language films
1950s British films